An abstracting service is a service that provides abstracts of publications, often on a subject or group of related subjects, usually on a subscription basis. An indexing service is a service that assigns descriptors and other kinds of access points to documents. The word indexing service is today mostly used for computer programs, but may also cover services providing back-of-the-book indexes, journal indexes, and related kinds of indexes. An indexing and abstracting service is a service that provides shortening or summarizing of documents and assigning of descriptors for referencing documents. 

The product is often an abstracts journal or a bibliographic index, which may be a subject bibliography or a bibliographic database. 

Guidelines for indexing and abstracting, including the evaluation of such services, are given in the literature of library and information science.

See also
 Bibliography
 Citation index
 Guide to information sources
 List of academic databases and search engines
 Subject indexing

References

External links
American Society of Indexers: https://web.archive.org/web/20111128132758/http://www.asindexing.org/i4a/pages/index.cfm?pageid=1
Society of Indexers (UK): http://www.indexers.org.uk/

Bibliographic databases and indexes